Krishna Kumar, better known by his stage name K, is an Indian music composer.

Background
K did his schooling at Padma Seshadri Bala Bhavan, Chennai, where he took lessons in playing the keyboard. He quickly progressed and finished Grade 8 certificate exams in music with the Trinity College of Music, London. K graduated in Genetic Engineering (BTech) from SRM University, Chennai.

His musical talent found an outlet when he joined his first rock band aged 12, and then played with a successful funk/rock and roll band ‘Panatella’ for several years after that. He moved to creating jingles for advertisements and corporate films, singing several songs for the same.

Music career
In the year 2010, K was brought on board for director Mysskin's film Yuddham Sei. The film's sound track was a hit. He then composed for Mysskin's  Mugamoodi starring Jiiva. His next big career break came when famed cinematographer Rajeev Ravi roped him for his directorial venture in Malayalam, Annayum Rasoolum. The movie went on to become a cult favourite.

He marked his debut in Bollywood with the Hindi remake of the hit Tamil film Pizza, by composing the background score of the movie. In 2015, the film Kirumi opened to positive response subsequently becoming one of the most acclaimed Tamil films of the year.

Almost for the entire first half of the year 2016, K was working on the Dulquer Salmaan starrer Malayalam film Kammatipaadam, his second collaboration with Rajeev Ravi. K's background score for the film too received tremendous praise, with a reviewer saying "Composer K's music peps up these action sequences. With his adrenaline igniting music, he even manages to make the sight of bones cracking look cool. He is to Rajeev Ravi what Amit Trivedi and Sneha Khanwalker were to Anurag Kashyap in Gangs Of Wasseypur".

Kallapadam, directed by debutant Vadivelu, was the first film in which K was featured on-screen. He had previously turned down a role in his first film 'Yuddham Sei', but had agreed to play one of the leads in Kallapadam.

Directed by M.Manikandan of Kaaka Muttai and Kutrame Dhandanai fame, Aandavan Kattalai, his next major release was very well received. The music for the film, including the 9 songs, was supplemented by a background score where the lyrics of the songs were based on the dialogues on screen. In 2017, a Telugu remake of the film was made by Chinni Krishna, named London Babulu, which featured music re-used from K's Tamil original. The remake only featured 5 out of the 9 tracks from the original.

Ammani, Lakshmy Ramakrishnan's 3rd film as a director, was released a month later amidst mounds of praises. The film received laurels from all sides, much to the surprise of the director who has been vocal in interviews about her expectations of a more neural response towards the film. The background music of the film was handled very maturely, leaving a lot of silent spaces, so as to not disturb the emotional and poignant storyline. The highlight of the Ammani album was 'Mazhai Ingillaye', sung by the prodigious Vaikom Vijayalakshmi, who rendered the song pitch perfect, adding to the unique blend of Carnatic music and synth sounds.

In 2016, K composed the background score for N. Padmakumar's 'A Billion Colour Story' which won several awards and accolades worldwide, including Best Feature, LIFF, London, and Best Feature Audience Award, IFF, Los Angeles.

In 2017, Sankalp Reddy's Ghazi (The Ghazi Attack) was released to raving reviews from viewers and critics alike. Produced by PVP Cinema, the film was released in three languages – Telugu, Tamil, and Hindi. The Hindi version of the film was distributed by Karan Johar’s Production House – Dharma Productions. K received widespread appreciation At the 65th National Film Awards 2018, the film won the Best Feature Film in Telugu.

Anando Brahma, a Telugu horror-comedy directed by Mahi V Raghav starring Taapsee Pannu, was released on 18 August 2017. K composed the music for the film. The promo song features Malgudi Subha and is a rendition of a Mohammed Rafi song from 1970.

K has worked on the music of Telugu film Yatra –  a biographical film about Y. S. Rajasekhara Reddy. The film is written and directed by Mahi V. Raghav and stars Mammootty as YSR.

In 2019, K agreed to compose for Prasanna Vithanage’s off-beat Sinhala film Gaadi which premiered at Busan International Film Festival in October 2019.

In late 2019, he was also signed by Mani Ratnam's Madras Talkies to compose the background score of Vaanam Kottattum, written and produced by Mani Ratnam and directed by his protege, Dhana Sekhar.

Film discography

Feature films

Indian films

Foreign films

Short films

Documentaries

Awards
'Best Background Score' -Yuddham Sei at the 2013 BIG 92.7FM Tamil Melody Awards (2013).

References

External links 
 
 Official Website

1987 births
Indian film score composers
Musicians from Tamil Nadu
Indian male singer-songwriters
Indian singer-songwriters
Living people
Padma Seshadri Bala Bhavan schools alumni
People from Nagapattinam district
Indian male film score composers